Lucas Estella Perri (born 10 December 1997) is a Brazilian professional footballer who plays as a goalkeeper for Botafogo.

Career statistics

Honours
São Paulo
Campeonato Paulista: 2021

References

1997 births
Living people
Sportspeople from Campinas
Brazilian footballers
Association football goalkeepers
Brazil youth international footballers
Campeonato Brasileiro Série A players
Associação Atlética Ponte Preta players
São Paulo FC players
Clube Náutico Capibaribe players
Botafogo de Futebol e Regatas players
Crystal Palace F.C. players
Brazilian expatriate footballers
Brazilian expatriate sportspeople in England
Expatriate footballers in England